The Miskolc Subregion (Hungarian: Miskolci kistérség) is a subregion in Northern Hungary. Its area is 1058 km². With a population of 267,582 (2009) it is the second most populated subregion in Hungary and the most populated in Borsod-Abaúj-Zemplén county. Its centre and largest city is Miskolc; there are five other towns – Sajószentpéter, Felsőzsolca, Alsózsolca, Emőd, Nyékládháza – and thirty-four villages belonging to the subregion.

Settlements

 Alacska
 Alsózsolca
 Arnót
 Berzék
 Bőcs
 Bükkaranyos
 Bükkszentkereszt
 Emőd
 Felsőzsolca
 Gesztely
 Harsány
 Hernádkak
 Hernádnémeti
 Kisgyőr

 Kistokaj
 Kondó
 Köröm
 Mályi
 Miskolc
 Muhi
 Nyékládháza
 Onga
 Ónod
 Parasznya
 Radostyán
 Répáshuta
 Sajóbábony
 Sajóecseg

 Sajóhídvég
 Sajókápolna
 Sajókeresztúr
 Sajólád
 Sajólászlófalva
 Sajópálfala
 Sajópetri
 Sajósenye
 Sajószentpéter
 Sajóvámos
 Szirmabesenyő
 Varbó

See also
Miskolc District (from 2013)

References 

Subregions of Hungary